John Roach may refer to any of the following:
John Roach (shipbuilder) (1816–1887), United States shipbuilder
John Roach (bishop) (1921–2003), bishop of the Catholic Church
John Roach (baseball) (1867–1934), former Major League Baseball pitcher
John Roach (footballer, born 1862), Welsh international footballer
John Roach (American football) (1933–2021), football player
John Roach (English footballer), English footballer played for Manchester United, FC Sète, and Accrington Stanley
John C. Roach, justice on the Kentucky Supreme Court
John Ross Roach (1900–1973), Canadian ice hockey player
John Vinson Roach II (1938–2022) pioneer of the personal computer

See also
John Roche (disambiguation)
Roach (surname)